pandit Ajjada Adibhatla Narayana Das (31 August 1864 – 2 January 1945) was a multifaceted fountainhead of talent in diverse fields of learning and forms of fine arts of Andhra Pradesh. He was born in Ajjada village, near Bobbili, presently in Balijipeta mandal of Vizianagaram district, Andhra Pradesh, India.

Pandit Ajjada Adibhatla Narayana Das garu, a versatile genius of all time from Andhra Pradesh. He was a poet, musician, dancer, linguist, and philosopher with an unparalleled body of work in a wide variety of subjects with great depts. A seemingly impossible feat by human effort inspiring the rest to push their limits. A Real life "Sakala KaLa Vallabha, " poly art exponent. An embodiment of Bharateeyata (Indian-ness) articulating the universal appeal, touching the unifying chord of Advaita or applied non-duality, among all fields of learning and arts dedicating a full life to study and deliver creative productivity in isolation competing with one-self maximizing time spent on the planet. He performed Swadhyaya (self-taught) like Tapas (penance) and vice versa. Making his life and body of work a compelling case study for scholars and aspirants in the same breath. His merit and perseverance proved that one can indeed become "a master of many trades" as long there is passion, grit and acumen. A noted previous century knighthood donned University Vice chancellor had hailed him as the "walking university" a contemporary AI Techie would call him a "Human chatGPT" and wonder permanently how his learning and generating model worked.     

Multifaceted Diamond Shining Profile

Polyglot Facet 
Narayana Das was a linguist with proficiency in as many as eight languages (including Arabic and Persian), poet, philosopher, playwright, composer, dancer, actor and the creator of the unique art form, Hari Katha. He had mastery over several Indian and classical languages like Telugu, Sanskrit, Tamil, Hindi, Bengali, Urdu, English, Arabic and Persian.

Literary Metered Poetry Facet 
Narayana Das was a scholar who had mastery over four classical languages (Sanskrit, Telugu, Arabic and Persian) and who translated from Persian and English into Sanskrit and Telugu; the only litterateur who wrote a comparative treatise on the works of Kalidas and Shakespeare; 

He was also a performer of Ashtavadhanam. He has written over a hundred books in Telugu, and Sanskrit. His works ranged from children's literature to philosophical treatises.

His literary output was extensive. He wrote original Kavyas and Prabandhas that reflect a rare creative genius, erudition and great felicity of expression. He wrote over fifty books in Telugu, Sanskrit and Atcha-Telugu (Desyandhramu or Telugu unmixed of Sanskrit). His works included original story-poems (Kavyas and Prabndhas), Harikathas, prose works, musical works, dramas, translations, treatises in philosophy and Vedic studies and children's literature.

He felt that Edward Fitzgerald's English translations did not do justice to the Persian poet Omar Khayyam's poetry. To demonstrate his viewpoint he translated both the original quatrains of Omar Khayyam and Edward Fitzgerald's English translation into two languages – Sanskrit and Atcha Telugu in different meters. The work entitled The Rubaiyat of Omar Khayyam (1932)[1] was acclaimed as a rare literary feat by the literati of his time. In a rare tribute, a leading newspaper reviewed the book as an editorial entitled A Monument of Scholarship.

In another voluminous display of scholarship, he compared the works of the Sanskrit dramatist Kālidāsa with those of Shakespeare. Entitled Nava Rasa Tarangini (1922) the book annotates passages consisting of the nine rasas or moods from the dramas of both the dramatists by translating them into Telugu.

His Sanskrit works include Harikathamrutam a compilation of three Hari Kathas, Tarakam an original allegorical poem and two Shatakas Ramachandra Shatakam and Kashi Shatakam. A Satakam usually consists of 100 verses written in the same prosody. 

He translated Lalithasahasranama in 'Natu' Telugu or pure Telugu language.

Music Composing & Performing Facet 
The only writer-composer who translated into Telugu and set to music Rig Vedic hymns and the only writer-composer who composed a geeta-malika comprising 90 Carnatic ragas. As a writer-composer who exhaustively composed music in all the 72 Carnatic ragas he was next only to Tyagaraja.

His musical accomplishments left him peerless in his time. Maestros of the musical world honoured him with titles like Laya Brahma and Panchamukhi Parameshwara for his ability to sing to five different Talas, beat with two arms, two feet and the head. Five different musicians used to keep time with him when he performed Panchamukhi.

The literary and musical elite of his time joined to honour him with the title Sangita Sahitya Sarvabhauma.

He was the first principal of the Maharajah's Government College of Music and Dance (Vijayarama Gana Pathasala) established by the Maharajah of Vizianagaram in 1919. The Maharajah in fact established the Music College, which was among the first few in South India, to honour the Pundit and enable enthusiasts to learn music from him. Dwaram Venkataswami Naidu the well-known Violin maestro was a lecturer in the college during the Pandit's tenure and succeeded him as principal.

He entranced Rabindranath Tagore with his rendering of Hindusthani Bhairavi. Tagore sought the curriculum of the Vizianagaram Music College to be introduced in Shantiniketan.

He composed a lyric, entitled Dasha Vidha Raga Navati Kusuma Manjari employing 90 ragas in the Manjari metre. Such a composition has never been attempted and is a testimony to his rare mastery over poetry and music. He set to musical notation 300-odd select ruks from the Rigveda in a work entitled Ruksangraham and taught playing them on the veena to students but also translated them as poems in Telugu.

Dance, Singing and Acting Fused Story Telling Facet 
Fusing the sister realms of poetry, music and dance he created a new art form which he called the Harikatha. Harikatha has a divine mythological core with poetry and music as the medium. Dance and histrionics form the visual expression.

The exponent of Harikatha should be able to compose and recite extempore the objective of the performance being to entertain and educate both the layman and the erudite scholar. Having invented the vehicle, he wrote twenty one Harikathas, seventeen in Telugu, and three in Sanskrit.

Self-Actualization Dimension 
A characteristic trait we notice in a number of instances in the life of Narayana Das is a compulsive urge to excel in everything he did. The conception and renunciation of 'Naa Eruka', his autobiography is an example that provides insight into his complex personality. He began writing what would have been the first autobiography in Telugu and sent the initial chapters, narrating his life story from birth to the age of about thirty, to the printers. There was a delay at the printers due to the pressure of work and in the meantime, another famous writer's autobiography came out. Narayana Das called off the project because of his obsessive desire to be 'second to none'. Thus was lost to the public not only an opportunity to read the great man's life story told in his own words with remarkable candor but also his perspective of his literary output and the literary and cultural zeitgeist of his time.

In the parlance of modern behavioral sciences, the term self-actualization is defined as a fundamental tendency to maximum realization and fulfilment of one's potential. In the case of an artiste, this means he tends to write, compose or perform to satisfy an inner urge oblivious to the environment. He competes only with himself. He sets his own standards of performance and after achieving them keeps raising them to a higher level. It is a continual upward spiral.

Self-actualization was the leitmotif of Narayana Das' life in all the fields he worked in, be it literature, music or other performing arts such as Avadahanam, and Hari Katha. He brushed aside fame and fortune. For example, it was said that he did not approve of a move to nominate him for the Nobel literary prize. The philosopher in him made him decline offers to be made court musician by the Maharajah of Mysore and later by the Maharaja of Vizianagaram, instead preferring an independent life lead in the service of God.

Even when he consented to head 'Shri Vijayarama Gana Pathashala', the music college the Maharajah of Vizianagaram founded for the express purpose of honoring him, he insisted that it be treated as a temple for Sri Rama and him as His servant. The only vanity he permitted himself was that he wanted to be second to none!

Philosophy Facet 
His magnum opus was a two-volume philosophical work entitled Jagadjyoti, meaning "Universal Beacon", in which he recorded his musings on various Indian philosophies, even accommodating atheist school of thought.

With Noted Contemporaries 

 He was also the one who taught Ashtadhyayi to Swami Vivekananda during his extensive travel of India in July 1890.
 Enraptured by his rendering of the Hindusthani Bhairavi raga, Rabindranath Tagore sought to introduce the curriculum followed by Narayana Das in his music college at Visva-Bharati University.
 It is said that his contemporary and educationalist Sir CR Reddy, the Vice Chancellor of Andhra university when he met Narayana Dasu garu, quipped "I am a mere Vice chancellor of a university, you are a walking university."

References and external links 

 Eminent Persons at vizianagaram.ap.nic.in
  (self published)
 
 
 
 
 
 
 Harikathapitamaha Srimadajjada Adibhatla Narayana Dasa Satajayantutsava Sanchika. 1967. Chirala. Samskruthi Samithi.
 
 
 
 

1864 births
1945 deaths
Telugu writers
Indian male musicians
20th-century Indian musicians
Musicians from Andhra Pradesh
19th-century Indian musicians
People from Vizianagaram district
People from Uttarandhra
20th-century male musicians
19th-century male musicians
English–Telugu translators
Sanskrit–Telugu translators